Cyphonisia is a genus of African brushed trapdoor spiders first described by Eugène Simon in 1889.

Species
 it contains thirteen species:
Cyphonisia affinitata Strand, 1907 – East Africa
Cyphonisia annulata Benoit, 1966 – Ghana
Cyphonisia itombwensis Benoit, 1966 – Congo
Cyphonisia kissi (Benoit, 1966) – Congo
Cyphonisia maculata (Roewer, 1953) – Congo
Cyphonisia maculipes Strand, 1906 – Cameroon
Cyphonisia manicata Simon, 1907 – Equatorial Guinea (Bioko)
Cyphonisia nesiotes Simon, 1907 – São Tomé and Príncipe
Cyphonisia nigella (Simon, 1889) – Congo
Cyphonisia obesa Simon, 1889 (type) – West, Central Africa
Cyphonisia rastellata Strand, 1907 – East Africa
Cyphonisia soleata Thorell, 1899 – Cameroon
Cyphonisia straba Benoit, 1966 – Congo

References

Barychelidae
Mygalomorphae genera
Spiders of Africa
Taxa named by Eugène Simon